The 2020 FIBA Women's Olympic Qualifying Tournament in Ostend was one of four 2020 FIBA Women's Olympic Qualifying Tournaments. The tournament was held in Ostend, Belgium, from 6 to 9 February 2020.

Canada and Belgium qualified for the Olympics, alongside Japan, who were pre-qualified as the host.

Teams

Venue

Squads

Standings

Results
All times are local (UTC+1).

Statistics and awards

Statistical leaders
Players

Points

Rebounds

Assists

Blocks

Steals

Teams

Points

Rebounds

Assists

Blocks

Steals

Awards
The all star-teams and MVP were announced on 9 February 2020.

References

External links
Official website

FIBA World Olympic Qualifying Tournament for Women
     
Qual
2019–20 in Belgian basketball
International basketball competitions hosted by Belgium
Sport in Ostend